Fenway Park is a baseball stadium located in Boston, Massachusetts, near Kenmore Square. Since 1912, it has been the home of the Boston Red Sox, the city's American League baseball team, and, since 1953, its only Major League Baseball (MLB) franchise. While the stadium was built in 1912, it was substantially rebuilt in 1934, and underwent major renovations and modifications in the 21st century.
It is the oldest active ballpark in MLB. Because of its age and constrained location in Boston's dense Fenway–Kenmore neighborhood, the park has many quirky features, including "The Triangle", Pesky's Pole, and the Green Monster in left field. It is the fifth-smallest among MLB ballparks by seating capacity, second-smallest by total capacity, and one of eight that cannot accommodate at least 40,000 spectators.

Fenway has hosted the World Series 11 times, with the Red Sox winning six of them and the Boston Braves winning one. Besides baseball games, it has also been the site of many other sporting and cultural events including professional football games for the Boston Redskins, Boston Yanks, and the Boston Patriots; concerts; soccer and hockey games (such as the 2010 NHL Winter Classic); and political and religious campaigns.

On March 7, 2012 (Fenway's centennial year), the park was added to the National Register of Historic Places. Former pitcher Bill Lee has called Fenway Park "a shrine". It is a pending Boston Landmark, which will regulate any further changes to the park. The ballpark is considered to be one of the most well-known sports venues in the world and a symbol of Boston.

History

In 1911, while the Red Sox were still playing on Huntington Avenue Grounds, owner John I. Taylor purchased the land bordered by Brookline Avenue, Jersey Street, Van Ness Street and Lansdowne Street and developed it into a larger baseball stadium known as Fenway Park. Taylor claimed the name Fenway Park came from its location in the Fenway neighborhood of Boston, which was partially created late in the nineteenth century by filling in marshland or "fens", to create the Back Bay Fens urban park. However, given that Taylor's family also owned the Fenway Realty Company, the promotional value of the naming at the time has been cited as well.

Like many classic ballparks, Fenway Park was constructed on an asymmetrical block, with consequent asymmetry in its field dimensions.  The park was designed by architect James E. McLaughlin, and the General Contractor was the Charles Logue Building Company.

The first game was played April 20, 1912, with mayor John F. Fitzgerald throwing out the first pitch and Boston defeating the New York Highlanders, 7–6 in 11 innings. Newspaper coverage of the opening was overshadowed by continuing coverage of the Titanic sinking a few days earlier.

In June 1919, a rally supporting Irish Independence turned out nearly 50,000 supporters to see the President of the Irish Republic, Éamon de Valera, and was allegedly the largest crowd ever in the ballpark.

The park's address was originally 24 Jersey Street. In 1977, the section of Jersey Street nearest the park was renamed Yawkey Way in honor of longtime Red Sox owner Tom Yawkey, and the park's address was 4 Yawkey Way until 2018, when the street's name was reverted to Jersey Street. The address is now 4 Jersey Street.

Changes to Fenway Park

Some of the changes include:
 In 1934, a hand-operated scoreboard was added, with (what was then considered cutting-edge technology) lights to indicate balls and strikes. The scoreboard is still updated by hand today from behind the wall. The National League scores were removed in 1976, but restored in 2003 and still require manual updates from on the field.
 In 1946, the first upper deck seats were installed.
 In 1947, arc lights were installed at Fenway Park. The Boston Red Sox were the third-to-last team out of 16 major league teams to have lights in their home park.
 In 1976, metric distances were added to the conventionally stated distances because it was thought at the time that the United States would adopt the metric system. As of 2022, only Miami's LoanDepot Park and  Toronto's Rogers Centre list metric distances. Fenway Park retained the metric measurements until mid-season 2002, when they were painted over. Also, Fenway's first electronic message board was added over the center field bleachers.
 In 1988, a glass-protected seating area behind home plate named The 600 Club was built. After Ted Williams' death in 2002, it was renamed the .406 Club in honor of his 1941 season in which he produced a .406 batting average. The section was renamed again in 2006 to the EMC Club.
 In 1993 the public restrooms were renovated and the original trough urinals were removed from the men's rooms. 
 In 1999 the auxiliary press boxes were added on top of the roof boxes along the first and third base sides of the field.
 Before the 2003 season, seats were added to the Green Monster.
 Before the 2004 season, seats were added to the right field roof, above the grandstand, called the Budweiser Right Field Roof. In December 2017 Samuel Adams renamed the deck the "Sam Deck."
 Before the 2008 season, the Coke bottles, installed in 1997, were removed to return the light towers to their original state. The temporary luxury boxes installed for the 1999 All-Star Game were removed and permanent ones were added to the State Street Pavilion level. Seats were also added down the left field line called the Coca-Cola Party-Deck.
 Before the 2011 season, three new scoreboards beyond right-center field were installed: a  scoreboard in right-center field, a  video screen in center field, a  video board in right field, along with a new video control room. The Gate D concourse has undergone a complete remodel with new concession stands and improved pedestrian flow. The wooden grandstand seats were all removed to allow the completion of the waterproofing of the seating bowl and completely refurbished upon re-installation.

New Fenway Park
On May 15, 1999, then-Red Sox CEO John Harrington announced plans for a new Fenway Park to be built near the existing structure. It was to have seated 44,130 and would have been a modernized replica of the current Fenway Park, with the same field dimensions except for a shorter right field and reduced foul territory. Some sections of the existing ballpark were to be preserved (mainly the original Green Monster and the third base side of the park) as part of the overall new layout. Most of the current stadium was to be demolished to make room for new development, with one section remaining to house a baseball museum and public park. The proposal was highly controversial; it projected that the park had less than 15 years of usable life, would require hundreds of millions of dollars of public investment, and was later revealed to be part of a scheme by current ownership to increase the marketable value of the team as they were ready to sell. Several groups (such as "Save Fenway Park") formed in an attempt to block the move. Discussion took place for several years regarding the new stadium proposal. One plan involved building a "Sports Megaplex" in South Boston, where a new Fenway would be located next to a new stadium for the New England Patriots. The Patriots ultimately built Gillette Stadium in Foxborough, their home throughout most of their history, which ended the Megaplex proposal. The Red Sox and the city of Boston failed to reach an agreement on building the new stadium, and in 2005, the Red Sox ownership group announced that the team would stay at Fenway Park indefinitely.

A significant renovation of Fenway Park stretched over a 10-year period beginning around 2002 headed by Janet Marie Smith, then Vice President of Planning and Development for the Sox.  The Boston Globe has described Smith as "the architect credited with saving Fenway Park."  At completion of the renovations, it was reported that Fenway Park remains usable until as late as 2062.

Capacity and sellout streak
Fenway's capacity differs between day and night games because, during day games, the seats in center field are covered with a black tarp in order to provide a batter's eye.

Fenway's lowest attendance was recorded on October 1, 1964, when a game against Cleveland Indians drew only 306 paid spectators.

On May 15, 2003, the Red Sox game against the Texas Rangers sold out, beginning a sellout streak that lasted until 2013. On September 8, 2008, when the Red Sox hosted the Tampa Bay Rays, Fenway Park broke the all-time Major League record for consecutive sellouts with 456, surpassing the record previously held by Jacobs Field in Cleveland. On June 17, 2009, the park celebrated its 500th consecutive Red Sox sellout. According to WBZ-TV, the team joined three NBA teams which achieved 500 consecutive home sellouts. The sellout streak ended on April 10, 2013 (with an attendance of 30,862) after the Red Sox sold out 794 regular season games and an additional 26 postseason games.

Features
The park is located along Lansdowne Street and Jersey Street in the Kenmore Square area of Boston. The area includes many buildings of similar height and architecture and thus it blends in with its surroundings. When pitcher Roger Clemens arrived in Boston for the first time in 1984, he took a taxi from Logan Airport and was sure the driver had misunderstood his directions when he announced their arrival at the park. Clemens recalled telling the driver "No, Fenway Park, it's a baseball stadium ... this is a warehouse." Only when the driver told Clemens to look up and he saw the light towers did he realize he was in the right place.

Fenway Park is one of the two remaining jewel box ballparks still in use in Major League Baseball, the other being Wrigley Field; both have a significant number of obstructed view seats, due to pillars supporting the upper deck. These are sold as such, and are a reminder of the architectural limitations of older ballparks.

George Will asserts in his book Men at Work that Fenway Park is a "hitters' ballpark", with its short right-field fence (302 feet), narrow foul ground (the smallest of any current major league park), and generally closer-than-normal outfield fences. (This rule had the unintended consequence of leading to the "Cookie-Cutter Stadium" era, which ended when Camden Yards opened in 1993.) Regarding the narrow foul territory, Will writes:

Will states that some observers might feel that these unique aspects of Fenway give the Red Sox an advantage over their opponents, given that the Red Sox hitters play 81 games at the home stadium while each opponent plays no more than nine games as visiting teams but Will does not share this view.

Fenway Park's bullpen wall is much lower than most other outfield walls; outfielders are known to end up flying over this wall when chasing balls hit that direction, such as with Torii Hunter when chasing a David Ortiz game-tying grand slam that direction in game 2 of the 2013 ALCS.

The Green Monster

The Green Monster is the nickname of the  left field wall in the park.

Part of the original ballpark construction of 1912, the wall is made of wood, but was covered in tin and concrete in 1934, when the scoreboard was added. The wall was covered in hard plastic in 1976. The scoreboard is manually updated throughout the game. If a ball in play goes through a hole in the scoreboard while the scorers are replacing numbers, the batter is awarded a ground rule double.

The inside walls of the Green Monster are covered with players' signatures from over the years. Despite the name, the Green Monster was not painted green until 1947; before that, it was covered with advertisements. The Monster designation is relatively new; for most of its history, it was simply called "the wall." In 2003, terrace-style seating was added on top of the wall.

"The Triangle"

That deep right-center point is conventionally given as the center field distance. The true center is unmarked,  from home plate, to the left of "the Triangle" when viewed from home plate.

The end of the bleachers form a right angle with the Green Monster and the flagpole stands within that little triangle. That is not the true power alley, but deep left-center. The true power alley distance is not posted.

"Williamsburg"
"Williamsburg" was the name, invented by sportswriters, for the bullpen area built in front of the right-center field bleachers in 1940. It was built there primarily for the benefit of Ted Williams, to enable him and other left-handed batters to hit more home runs, since it was  closer than the bleacher wall.

The Lone Red Seat
The lone red seat in the right field bleachers (Section 42, Row 37, Seat 21) signifies the longest home run ever hit at Fenway. According to Hit Tracker Online, the ball, if unobstructed, would have flown .

The ball landed on Joseph A. Boucher, penetrating his large straw hat and hitting him in the head. A confounded Boucher was later quoted as saying:
 

There have been other home runs hit at Fenway that have contended for the distance title. In the 2007 book The Year Babe Ruth Hit 104 Home Runs, researcher Bill Jenkinson found evidence that on May 25, 1926, Babe Ruth hit one in the pre-1934 bleacher configuration which landed five rows from the top in right field. This would have placed it at an estimated  from home plate. On June 23, 2001, Manny Ramirez hit one that struck a light tower above the Green Monster, which would have cleared the park had it missed.

Foul poles

Pesky's Pole is the name for the pole on the right field foul line, which stands  from home plate, the shortest outfield distance (left or right field) in Major League Baseball. Like the measurement of the left-field line at Fenway Park, this has been disputed. Aerial shots show it to be noticeably shorter than the (actual) 302 foot line in right field, and Pesky has been quoted as estimating it to be "around 295 feet". There is no distance posted on the wall.

Despite the short wall, home runs in this area are relatively rare, as the fence curves away from the foul pole sharply. The pole was named after Johnny Pesky, a light-hitting shortstop and long-time coach for the Red Sox, who hit some of his six home runs at Fenway Park around the pole but never off the pole. Pesky (playing 1942 to 1952, except for 1943 to 1945) was a contact hitter who hit just 17 home runs in his career (6 at Fenway Park). It's not known how many of these six actually landed near the pole. The Red Sox give credit to pitcher and Sox broadcaster Mel Parnell for coining the name. The most notable for Pesky is a two-run homer in the eighth inning of the 1946 Opening Day game to win the game. However, Pesky hit just one home run in a game pitched by Parnell, a two-run shot in the first inning of a game against Detroit played on June 11, 1950. The game was eventually won by the visiting Tigers in the 14th inning on a three-run shot by Tigers right fielder Vic Wertz and Parnell earned a no-decision that day.

The term, though it had been in use since the 1950s, became far more common when Parnell became a Red Sox broadcaster in 1965. Mark Bellhorn hit what proved to be the game-winning home run off of Julián Tavárez in game 1 of the 2004 World Series off that pole's screen.

On September 27, 2006, Pesky's 87th birthday, the Red Sox officially dedicated the right field foul pole as "Pesky's Pole", with a commemorative plaque placed at its base.

The seat directly on the foul side of Pesky's Pole in the front row is Section 94, Row E, Seat 5 and is usually sold as a lone ticket.

In a ceremony before the Red Sox' 2005 game against the Cincinnati Reds, the pole on the left field foul line atop the Green Monster was named the Fisk Foul Pole, or Pudge's Pole, in honor of Carlton Fisk. Fisk provided one of baseball's most enduring moments in Game 6 of the 1975 World Series against the Reds. Facing Reds right-hander Pat Darcy in the 12th inning with the score tied at 6, Fisk hit a long fly ball down the left field line. It appeared to be heading foul, but Fisk, after initially appearing unsure of whether or not to continue running to first base, famously jumped and waved his arms to the right as if to somehow direct the ball fair. It ricocheted off the foul pole, winning the game for the Red Sox and sending the series to a seventh and deciding game the next night, which Cincinnati won. Like Johnny Pesky's No. 6, Carlton had his No. 27 player number retired by the team.

"Duffy's Cliff"

As a result, a left fielder had to play part of the territory running uphill (and back down). Boston's first star left fielder, Duffy Lewis, mastered the skill so well that the area became known as "Duffy's Cliff".

The incline served two purposes: it was a support for a high wall and it was built to compensate for the difference in grades between the field and Lansdowne Street on the other side of that wall. The wall also served as a spectator-friendly seating area during the dead ball era when overflow crowds, in front of the later Green Monster, would sit on the incline behind ropes.

As part of the 1934 remodeling of the ballpark, the bleachers, and the wall itself, Red Sox owner Tom Yawkey arranged to flatten the ground along the base of the wall, so that Duffy's Cliff no longer existed. The base of the left field wall is several feet below the grade level of Lansdowne Street, accounting for the occasional rat that might spook the scoreboard operators.

A reporter from The Boston Globe was able to sneak into Fenway Park and measure the distance.

Dell EMC Club
In 1983, private suites were added to the roof behind home plate. In 1988, 610 stadium club seats enclosed in glass and named the "600 Club", were added above the home plate grandstand replacing the existing press box. The press box was then added to the top of the 600 Club. The 1988 addition has been thought to have changed the air currents in the park to the detriment of hitters. In 2002, the organization renamed the club seats the ".406 Club" (in honor of Ted Williams' batting average in 1941).

Between the 2005 and 2006 seasons the existing .406 club was rebuilt as part of the continuing ballpark expansion efforts. The second deck now features two open-air levels: the bottom level is the new "Dell EMC Club" featuring 406 seats and concierge services and the upper level, the State Street Pavilion, has 374 seats and a dedicated standing room area. The added seats are wider than the previous seats.

Program hawkers
In 1990, Mike Rutstein started handing out the first issue of Boston Baseball Magazine (originally called Baseball Underground) outside of the park. He was frustrated with the quality of the program being sold inside the park, which also came out once every two months. The program was sold for $1, half the cost of the programs inside the park. To sell the program, Rutstein's employees would stand outside the park wearing bright red shirts and greet fans by holding a program up and shouting "Program, Scorecard, One Dollar!". By 1992, the Red Sox organization filed complaints with the city code enforcement arguing that the scorecard inside the magazine was not covered under the First Amendment protecting magazines and that Rutstein's employees were operating on the streets without a permit. Despite a lot of attention in the news, Rutstein said the charges were not pursued and no further legal action was taken. In 2012, one of Rutstein's long time employees Sly Egidio quit Boston Baseball to start "The Yawkey Way Report" named after Yawkey Way. By that time, Boston Baseball was selling for $3 per program, $2 cheaper than the in-park programs selling for $5. The Yawkey Way Report cost $1 and Egidio stationed his hawkers close to Boston Baseball's hawkers, starting a "hawker war." The Yawkey Way Report also came with baseball cards, ponchos and tote bags, which caused Rutstein to file his own complaints with Boston city code enforcement. Despite the rivalry, both programs continue to be hawked outside of Fenway Park and are often the first thing fans see when they approach the stadium on game-day.

Use

Baseball

The Red Sox' one-time cross-town rivals, the Boston Braves, used Fenway Park for the 1914 World Series and the 1915 season until Braves Field was completed; ironically, the Red Sox would then use Braves Field – which had a much higher seating capacity – for their own World Series games in 1915 and 1916.

Since 1990 (except in 2005 when, because of field work, it was held in a minor league ballpark, and 2020, as the tournament was cancelled due to the COVID-19 pandemic), Fenway Park has also hosted the final round of a Boston-area intercollegiate baseball tournament called the Baseball Beanpot, an equivalent to the more well-known hockey Beanpot tourney. The teams play the first rounds in minor league stadiums before moving on to Fenway for the final and a consolation game. Boston College, Harvard University, Northeastern University, and the University of Massachusetts Amherst compete in the four-team tournament.

Since at least 1997 Neil Diamond's "Sweet Caroline" has been played at Fenway Park during Red Sox games, in the middle of the eighth inning since 2002. On opening night of the 2010 season at Fenway Park, the song was performed by Diamond himself.

Beginning in 2006, the Red Sox have hosted the "Futures at Fenway" event, where two of their minor-league affiliates play a regular-season doubleheader as the "home" teams. Before the Futures day started, the most recent minor-league game held at Fenway had been the Eastern League All-Star Game in 1977.

From 1970 to 1987, the Cape Cod Baseball League (CCBL) played its annual all-star game at various major league stadiums. The games were interleague contests between the CCBL and the Atlantic Collegiate Baseball League (ACBL). The 1975, 1977, 1979, 1981, 1983, 1985 and 1987 games were played at Fenway. The MVP of the 1977 contest was future major league slugger Steve Balboni, who clobbered two home runs over the Green Monster that day. The CCBL returned to Fenway in 2009, 2010 and 2011 for its intraleague all-star game matching the league's East and West divisions. The 2009 game starred East division MVP and future Boston Red Sox Chris Sale of Florida Gulf Coast University. The CCBL also holds an annual workout day at Fenway where CCBL players are evaluated by major league scouts.

Boxing
On October 9, 1920, Fenway Park was the site of the first open-air boxing show in Boston. The card featured four bouts. Although Eddie Shevlin and Paul Doyle fought in the feature bout, Daniel J. Saunders of the Boston Daily Globe described heavyweights Battling McCreery and John Lester Johnson as "the only boxers who caused any excitement". McCreery, who according to Saunders, "was to take a flop in five rounds", won by judge's decision in ten rounds. After the fight, Johnson punched McCreery while McCreery was trying to shake his hand. McCreery then knocked Johnson out of the ring and hit him over the head with his chair. The card drew 5,000 spectators (half of what was expected) and brought in $6,100 (several thousand less than what was promised to the fighters).

In 1928, New England Welterweight Champion Al Mello headlined three cards at Fenway. He defeated Billy Murphy in front of a crowd of 12,000 on June 26, Charlie Donovan on August 31, and Murphy again on September 13.

On July 2, 1930, future World Heavyweight Champion James J. Braddock made his debut in that weight class. He defeated Joe Monte in ten rounds.

On September 2, 1930, Babe Hunt defeated Ernie Schaaf in what The Boston Daily Globe described as a "dull bout" and a "big disappointment". The undercard included future light heavyweight champion George Nichols, who defeated Harry Allen of Brockton, Massachusetts in ten rounds.

In 1932, Eddie Mack promoted ten cards at Fenway Park. The August 2 card featured World Light Heavyweight Champion Maxie Rosenbloom defeating Joe Barlow of Roxbury and Taunton' Henry Emond defeating The Cocoa Kid. On August 23, Dave Shade defeated Norman Conrad of Wilton, New Hampshire in front of 3,500 attendees. The September 6 card was headlined by World junior lightweight champion Kid Chocolate, who defeated Steve Smith.

On June 25, 1936, former world heavyweight champion Jack Sharkey defeated Phil Brubaker in what would be his final career victory.

In 1937, Rip Valenti and the Goodwin Athletic Club promoted five cards at Fenway. Three of these were headlined by New England Heavyweight Champion Al McCoy. On June 16 McCoy defeated Natie Brown in front of a crowd of 4,516. On July 29 he knocked out Jack McCarthy in the third round. On August 24 he and Tony Shucco fought to a draw. Future WBA featherweight champion Sal Bartolo fought one of his first professional fights on the May 24 undercard.

On June 25, 1945, Tami Mauriello knocked out Lou Nova in 2:47. An estimated crowd of 8,000 was in attendance.

On July 12, 1954, Tony DeMarco knocked out George Araujo 58 seconds into the fifth round in front of 12,000 spectators.

The most recent boxing event at Fenway took place on June 16, 1956. The undercard consisted of Eddie Andrews vs. George Chimenti, Bobby Courchesne vs. George Monroe for the New England Lightweight Championship, and Barry Allison vs. Don Williams for the New England Middleweight Championship. In the main event, Tony DeMarco defeated Vince Martinez by decision. An estimated 15,000 were in attendance - far below promoter Sam Silverman's expectations.

Soccer
On October 17, 1925, the Boston Soccer Club and the Fall River Marksmen of the American Soccer League played a scoreless tie before 4,000 fans. Boston also hosted the Providence Clamdiggers and Indiana Flooring at Fenway later that season. On June 18, 1928, Boston played Rangers F.C. to a 2–2 tie in front of a crowd of 10,000. In 1929, Boston hosted two more matches at Fenway Park; a 3–2 victory over the New Bedford Whalers on August 10 and a 3–2 loss to Fall River on August 17.

On May 30, 1931, 8,000 fans were on hand to see the American Soccer League champion New York Yankees defeat Celtic 4–3. The Yankees goalkeeper, Johnny Reder, would later return to play for the Boston Red Sox. During 1968, the park was home to the Boston Beacons of the now-defunct NASL.

On July 21, 2010, Fenway hosted an exhibition game between European soccer clubs Celtic F.C. and Sporting C.P. in an event called "Football at Fenway". A crowd of 32,162 watched the two teams play to a 1–1 draw. Celtic won 6–5 on penalty shoot out, winning the first Fenway football challenge Trophy. Recent matches have taken place between Liverpool, an English Premier League club owned by Fenway Sports Group, and A.S. Roma, an Italian Serie A club owned by FSG partner Thomas R. DiBenedetto. The July 25, 2012 match ended in a 2–1 win for AS Roma before a crowd of 37,169. AS Roma also won the rematch on July 23, 2014, by a score of 1–0.  On July 21, 2019, Liverpool returned to Fenway for a preseason match against Sevilla, the Spanish team won 2–1 at the end of full-time.

American football

Football has been played at Fenway since at least 1916. In 1926, the first American Football League's Boston Bulldogs played at both Fenway and Braves Field; the Boston Shamrocks of the second AFL did the same in 1936 and 1937. The National Football League's Boston Redskins played at Fenway for four seasons (1933–1936) after playing their inaugural season in 1932 at Braves Field as the Boston Braves. The Boston Yanks played there in the 1940s; and the American Football League's Boston Patriots called Fenway Park home from 1963 to 1968 after moving there from Nickerson Field. At various times in the past, Dartmouth College, Boston College, Brown University, and Boston University teams have also played football games at Fenway Park. Boston College and Notre Dame played a game at Fenway in 2015 as part of Notre Dame's Shamrock Series. The annual Harvard–Yale game in November 2018 was played at Fenway.

In September 2019, it was announced that the Fenway Bowl, a postseason bowl game, would be played at Fenway Park beginning in 2020, pitting a team from the Atlantic Coast Conference against a team from the American Athletic Conference. However, both the 2020 and 2021 games were canceled, due to the COVID-19 pandemic. The bowl was finally played for the first time in December 2022, as Louisville defeated Cincinnati.

Team records at Fenway

Hockey

Fenway Park has hosted ice hockey games on five separate occasions, beginning in 2010 when the third annual NHL Winter Classic was held at the stadium on New Year's Day. The Boston Bruins beat the Philadelphia Flyers 2–1 in sudden-death overtime, securing the first home-team victory in the relatively short history of the annual series. The 2010 Winter Classic paved the way for further use of the stadium for ice hockey, as the "Frozen Fenway" series was introduced. Frozen Fenway is a semi-annual series of collegiate and amateur games featuring ice hockey teams from local and regional high schools, colleges, and universities. Division I matches between Hockey East rivals have been a staple of the Frozen Fenway series, which has seen games played in 2012, 2014, 2017, and 2023 at the ballpark. When not in use for games, the rink is also opened to the public for free ice skating. Fenway Park became the first stadium to host two Winter Classic games in January 2023, as the Boston Bruins once again secured a 2–1 victory, this time defeating the Pittsburgh Penguins.

Hurling and Gaelic football
Fenway has hosted Gaelic games over the years. On June 6, 1937, Mayo, the All-Ireland Football champions, defeated a Massachusetts team, 17–8, and on November 8, 1954, Cork, the All-Ireland Hurling champions, defeated an American line-up, 37–28. In more recent times, the Fenway Hurling Classic for the Players Champions Cup has been staged, first in November 2015 when Galway defeated Dublin, and subsequently in November 2017 and November 2018.

Concerts

Fenway has been home to various concerts beginning in 1973 when Stevie Wonder and Ray Charles first played there. No further concerts were played there until 2003 when Bruce Springsteen and the E Street Band played a leg of their The Rising Tour. Since 2003, there has been at least one concert every year at Fenway by such artists as Bruce Springsteen and the E Street Band, Jimmy Buffett, Billy Joel, Journey, Def Leppard, The Rolling Stones, Neil Diamond, The Police, Jason Aldean, Mötley Crüe, Dave Matthews Band, Tom Petty & The Heartbreakers, Aerosmith, Phish, Roger Waters, Paul McCartney, James Taylor (2015–2017 consecutively: 2015 & 2017 with Bonnie Raitt, 2016 with Jackson Browne), Pearl Jam, Foo Fighters, Dead & Company and New Kids On The Block 2011 (with Backstreet Boys), 2017 and 2021.

In 2017, Lady Gaga brought her Joanne World Tour to the stadium, making her the first woman to headline a concert there. In 2022, she returned with The Chromatica Ball. In 2019, The Who played their first ever show at the stadium with the Boston Symphony Orchestra. On August 3, 2021, Guns N' Roses played a show as a part of their 2020 Tour, where they revealed a new song "Absurd". Aerosmith returned for their 50th-anniversary celebrations on September 8, 2022 and the show labeled the venue's highest ticket sales to date.

Ski and snowboard

Polartec Big Air At Fenway is the first big air snowboarding and skiing competition that was held on February 11–12, 2016. This event was part of the U.S. Grand Prix Tour and the International Ski Federation's World Tour. Notable winter athletes that competed are Ty Walker, Sage Kotsenburg, and Joss Christensen.

Public address announcers

Frank Fallon was the first public address (PA) announcer for the Red Sox, and held the job from 1953 to 1957. Fred Cusick, better known for his career of announcing Boston Bruins hockey games, joined him in 1956 and also left after 1957. Jay McMaster took over in 1958, until his replacement by Sherm Feller in 1967. Feller served as the announcer for 26 years until his death after the 1993 season. He was known for beginning his games by welcoming the fans with "Good afternoon, ladies and gentlemen, boys and girls. Welcome to Fenway Park", and ending them by saying "Thank you." Leslie Sterling took the job for the 1994 season, becoming the second female PA announcer in the history of Major League Baseball. Ed Brickley took over in 1997, and was replaced by Carl Beane in 2003. Beane was regarded as an "iconic" announcer, and served until his death in 2012, which was caused by a heart attack suffered while driving. Fenway used a series of guest announcers to finish the 2012 season before hiring its current announcers: Henry Mahegan, Bob Lobel, and Dick Flavin.

Retired numbers

There are eleven retired numbers above the right field grandstand. The numbers retired by the Red Sox are red on a white circle. Jackie Robinson's 42, which was retired by Major League Baseball, is blue on a white circle. The two are further delineated through the font difference; Boston numbers are in the same style as the Red Sox jerseys, while Robinson's number is in the more traditional "block" numbering found on the Dodgers jerseys.

The numbers originally hung on the right-field facade in the order in which they were retired: 9-4-1-8. Dan Shaughnessy pointed out that the numbers, when read as a date (9/4/18), marked the eve of the first game of the 1918 World Series, the last championship that the Red Sox won before 2004. After the facade was repainted, the numbers were rearranged in numerical order. The numbers remained in numerical order until the 2012 season, when the numbers were rearranged back into the order in which they were retired by the Red Sox.

The Red Sox policy on retiring uniform numbers was once one of the most stringent in baseball—the player had to be elected to the National Baseball Hall of Fame, play at least 10 years with the team, and retire as a member of the Red Sox. The final requirement was waived for Carlton Fisk as he had finished his playing career with the Chicago White Sox. However, Fisk was assigned a Red Sox front office job and effectively "finished" his baseball career with the Red Sox in this manner. In 2008, the ownership relaxed the requirements further with the retirement of Johnny Pesky's number 6. Pesky has not been inducted into the Hall of Fame, but in light of his over 50 years of service to the club, the management made an exception. Pesky would have had 10 seasons, but he was credited with the three seasons he served as an Operations Officer in the U.S. Navy during World War II. The most recent number retired was 34, worn by 2013 World Series Most Valuable Player David Ortiz.

Ground rules

 A ball going through the scoreboard, either on the bounce or fly, is a ground rule double.
 A fly ball striking left-center field wall to right of or on the line behind the flag pole is a home run.
 A fly ball striking wall or flag pole and bouncing into bleachers is a home run.
 A fly ball striking line or right of same on wall in center is a home run.
 A fly ball striking wall left of line and bouncing into bullpen is a home run.
 A ball sticking in the bullpen screen or bouncing into the bullpen is a ground rule double.
 A batted or thrown ball remaining behind or under canvas or in tarp cylinder is a ground rule double.
 A ball striking the top of the scoreboard in left field in the ladder below top of wall and bouncing out of the park is a ground rule double.
 A fly ball that lands above the red line on top of the Green Monster and bounces onto the field of play is ruled a home run.
 A fly ball that hits the rail in the right-center triangle is a home run.
It is a misconception among fans that a fly ball that gets stuck in the ladder above the scoreboard on the left field wall is ruled a ground rule triple. There is no mention of it in the Red Sox ground rules list.

Access and transportation
 Fenway Park can be reached by the Massachusetts Bay Transportation Authority (MBTA) Green Line subway's Kenmore station on the "B", "C" and "D" branches, as well as Fenway station on the "D" branch.
 Lansdowne station is served by all MBTA Framingham/Worcester Line commuter rail trains. This line provides service from South Station or Back Bay and points west of Boston. In 2014, the new station was completed with full-length platforms, elevators, and access to Brookline Avenue and Beacon Street.
 Another option is taking the Orange Line or commuter rail to Back Bay or Ruggles. The stations are a 30-minute walk to Fenway.
 Although the Massachusetts Turnpike passes close to Fenway Park, there is no direct connection. Motorists are directed to use local streets or Storrow Drive to access the park.

See also

 List of Major League Baseball stadiums
 National Register of Historic Places listings in southern Boston, Massachusetts
 Cask'n Flagon

Notes

References

External links

 Stadium site on MLB.com
 Fenway Park Seating Chart  at Precise Seating
 Fenway Park info, including information on visiting
 Fenway Park facts, photos, statistics and trivia
 Boston Ballpark History . MLB.com.
 Fenway Park dynamic diagram at Clem's Baseball
 Google Maps Aerial view
 VisitingFan.com: Reviews of Fenway Park
 Fenway Park Seating Chart
 Fenway Park 100th Anniversary page MLB.com
 Fenway Park at Stadium Journey
 Fenway Park at Sportlistings directory
 Sanborn map showing Fenway Park, 1914

 
1912 establishments in Massachusetts
American Football League (1926) venues
American Football League (1936) venues
American Football League (1940) venues
American Football League venues
American football venues in Boston
Baseball venues in Boston
Boston Braves stadiums
Boston College Eagles football venues
Boston College Eagles baseball venues
Boston Patriots (AFL) stadiums
Boston Red Sox stadiums
Boston Redskins stadiums
Boston University Terriers football
Boston University Terriers baseball
College football venues
College baseball venues in the United States
Fenway–Kenmore
Ice hockey venues in Massachusetts
Jewel Box parks
Landmarks in Fenway–Kenmore
Major League Baseball venues
National Register of Historic Places in Boston
North American Soccer League (1968–1984) stadiums
Outdoor ice hockey venues in the United States
Soccer venues in Massachusetts
Sports venues on the National Register of Historic Places in Massachusetts
Sports venues completed in 1912